Oaklana is a historic plantation house located near Roxobel, Bertie County, North Carolina. It was built about 1825, and is a -story, frame Federal style dwelling with a two-story rear ell.  Also on the property are the contributing smokehouse and dairy.

It was added to the National Register of Historic Places in 1982.

References

Plantation houses in North Carolina
Houses on the National Register of Historic Places in North Carolina
Federal architecture in North Carolina
Houses completed in 1825
Houses in Bertie County, North Carolina
National Register of Historic Places in Bertie County, North Carolina